Del Rancho Para el Mundo is the Latin Grammy Award nominated third studio album by Regional Mexican recording artist Espinoza Paz. It was released on 10 August 2010 by Disa Records.

Track listing
All songs were composed by Espinoza Paz.
Te Voy A Extrañar 3:09
El Culpable 3:50	 	
Niña Bien 2:41
Al Diablo Lo Nuestro 4:01		
Indestructible	3:18	
Volver	4:12	
Kilometros De Aquí 3:29
Esta Es Pa´ Mi Viejo 3:23	 
Calles De Tierra 3:39	 
Mis Amistades	3:47	 	
24 Horas 3:29

Charts

Weekly charts

Year-end charts

Sales and certifications

References

http://www.cduniverse.com/productinfo.asp?pid=8234866

External links
 

Espinoza Paz albums